The Anuppur Thermal Power Project or ATPP as popularly cited is a 2520-megawatt (MW) coal-based thermal power station located in Anuppur District, Madhya Pradesh, India. The project is being commissioned by Hindustan Powerprojects (formerly Moser Baer).

Key People 
Ratul Puri — Company Chairman - Nephew of Kamal Nath
Raghav Trivedi — President Thermal
Bashant Kumar Mishra;— Project Head

Offices 

The company has its office at following places.

Delhi — Okhla Phase III

Bhopal — Rivierra Town

Anuppur — Kotma Road

Phase I 
A sub-project with estimated output of 1200 MW, comprising two 600 MW subcritical units, is under construction as of June 2015. Lanco is the EPC Contractor.

Water for the project is being taken from the Son River. Coal is being procured from Coal India Limited's South Eastern Coalfields mines located in Madhya Pradesh and Chhattisgarh.

The entire operation is spread over four villages: Laharpur Murra, Guwari, Belia, and Jaithari. Environmental clearance for Phase I was received in May 2010 from MoEF Delhi. Consent to Operate authorization has also been received from the Madhya Pradesh Pollution Control Board.

COD achieved in May 2015 for Unit One. COD achieved in April 2016 for Unit Two.

PPA update: 70 per cent of the power being generated in the plant will be sold to Madhya Pradesh and Uttar Pradesh at tariffs between Rs. 3.60 a unit and Rs. 3.80 a unit.

Phase II 

ATPP Phase II of the power project, with expected output of 1320 MW and consisting of two 660 MW super-critical units, is in pre-development phase as of January 2015. Company applied for Environmental Clearance for this second phase in April 2014.

See also 

 Satpura Thermal Power Station
 Sanjay Gandhi Thermal Power Station
 Amarkantak Thermal Power Station

References

External links 
Company website http://www.hindustanpowerprojects.com/
 http://www.thehindubusinessline.com/todays-paper/tp-news/hindustan-power-projects-may-look-at-initial-public-offering-next-year/article8477047.ece

Anuppur district
Coal-fired power stations in Madhya Pradesh
Anuppur
2016 establishments in Madhya Pradesh
Energy infrastructure completed in 2016